Ardanaiseig is a settlement on Loch Awe, Argyll and Bute, Scotland.

Villages in Argyll and Bute